or  is a private art university located in Tokyo, Japan.  It is known as one of the top art schools in Japan.

History
The forerunner of Tamabi was Tama Imperial Art School (多摩帝国美術学校, Tama Teikoku Bijutsu Gakkō) founded in 1935.  It was chartered as a junior college in 1950 and became a four-year college in 1953.

Campus

 Hachioji Campus (Hachioji city, Tokyo)
 Faculty of Art and Design and Graduate School of Art and Design (most of the departments are located on this campus)

 Kaminoge Campus (Kaminoge, Setagaya-ward, Tokyo)
 Headquarters office, Faculty of Art and Design, and Graduate School of Art and Design (Department of Integrated Design and Department of Scenography Design, Drama, and Dance)
 Seminar House
 Mt. Fuji Foothills Seminar House (Yamanakako, Minamitsuru District, Yamanashi)
 Nara Antiquities Seminar House (Nara city, Nara)

Academics

Faculty of Art and Design
 Department of Painting
 Japanese Painting Course
 Oil Painting Course
 Graphic Arts Course
 Department of Sculpture
 Department of Ceramic, Glass, and Metal Works
 Ceramic Program
 Glass Program
 Metal Program
 Department of Graphic Design
 Department of Product and Textile Design
 Product Design Course
 Textile Design Course
 Department of Architecture and Environmental Design
 Architecture Design
 Interior Design
 Landscape Design
 Department of Information Design
 Art and Media Course
 Interaction Design Course
 Department of Art Science
 Department of Integrated Design
 Department of Scenography Design, Drama, and Dance
 Scenography Design Course
 Drama and Dance Course

Graduate School of Art and Design
 Master's Degree Course
Experimental Workshop（EWS）
 Doctoral Degree Course

courses

Tama Art University Creative Leadership Program

Research institutes and facilities 

 Tama Art University Library
 FabLab (beta)

International joint projects

Pacific Rim Project 
 Since 2006, students from both Tama Art University and Art Center College of Design who study in the field of design have collaborated on the Pacific Rim Project. The Pacific Rim Project focuses on global issues such as environmental protection, natural disasters and related topics over the course of a 14-week program. The Project is based on collaborative research, the results of which are summarized and shared via public exhibits.

(Color/Materials/Trends Exploration Laboratory)



Banana Textile Project

Day-see Program

List of presidents 

Reikichi Kita
Hisui Sugiura, 1935–1947
Kinji Inoue, 1947–1968
Ishida Eiichirō, April to November 1968
Ichiro Fukuzawa, 1968–1970
Shinichi Mashita, 1970–1975
Yorihiro Naito, 1979–1987
Kenshi Goto, 1987–1999
Nobuo Tsuji, 1999–2003
Shiro Takahashi, 2003–2007
Yoshihide Seita, 2007–2011
Takenobu Igarashi, 2011–2015
Akira Tatehata, 2015-

Notable current and past faculty

 Shigeo Anzai, photographer
 Ay-O, artist 
 So Aono, novelist
 Shinji Aoyama, film director
 Shigeru Ban, architect
 Naoto Fukasawa, industrial designer
 Tsuneari Fukuda, dramatist
 Yasutake Funakoshi, sculptor
 Fumiko Hori, painter
 Haruomi Hosono, musician
 Masuo Ikeda, painter
 Kenji Imai, architect
 Eiichiro Ishida, cultural anthropologist
 Toyo Ito, architect
 Bishin Jumonji, photographer
 Kazuo Kawasaki, industrial designer 
 Matazo Kayama, Japanese painter
 Lee Ufan, painter and sculptor
 Kiyoshi Miki, philosopher
 Chihiro Minato, photographer and art theorist
 Hideki Noda, actor
 Togyu Okumura, Japanese painter
 Kenjiro Sano, graphic designer
 Timon Screech, historian of Japanese art
 Kazuyo Sejima, architect
 Nobuo Sekine, sculptor
 Keisuke Serizawa, textile designer
 Hisui Sugiura, graphic designer. One of the founders of Tama Teikoku Bijutsu Gakko (predecessor of Tama Art University) in 1935.
 Isao Takahata, film director
 Saburo Teshigawara, choreographer
 Charles Tsunashima, furniture designer
 Tadanori Yokoo, graphic designer

Notable alumni

Art and Design

Graphic designers
 Kenjiro Sano
 Kashiwa Sato
 Makoto Wada

Fashion designers
 Issey Miyake

Industrial designers
 Naoto Fukasawa
 Masahiro Mori

Fine artists
 Firoz Mahmud (Bangladesh)
 Yuken Teruya
 Susumu Koshimizu
 Hiroko Okada
 Kenjiro Okazaki
 Kakiemon Sakaida
 Nobuo Sekine
 Kishio Suga
 Aya Takano
 Erina Matsui
 Takeshi Motomiya

Photographers
 Akira Fujii
 Miyako Ishiuchi
 Yoshio Itagaki
 Ryuji Miyamoto
 Mika Ninagawa

Entertainment and communications

Directors/filmmakers
 Hiroyuki Imaishi
 Kunio Kato
 Kentaro Otani
 Sarina Nihei

Manga artists
 Usamaru Furuya
 Etsumi Haruki
 Daisuke Igarashi
 Yoshiyuki Nishi
 Saori Oguri
 Mari Okazaki
 Naoki Saito
 Tamakichi Sakura
 Hiroaki Samura
 Kotobuki Shiriagari
 Gengoroh Tagame
 Benkyo Tamaoki
 Kei Toume
 Hajime Ueda
 Reiji Yamada
 Makoto Yukimura

Actors
 Shintaro Asanuma
 Masaki Kyomoto
 Showtaro Morikubo
 Kōichi Satō
 Naoto Takenaka
 Touta Tarumi

Comedians
 Jin Katagiri (Rahmens)
 Kentaro Kobayashi (Rahmens)

Musicians
 Hirohisa Horie
 Yumi Matsutoya
 Shintaro Sakamoto (Yura Yura Teikoku)
 Emi Sugiyama (Heartsdales)
 Nemu Yumemi (Dempagumi.inc)

Cooperation with other institutions in Japan

ARTSAT Project 
 University of Tokyo

Tokyo 5 Art Universities Joint Graduation Exhibition ("Gobidai-ten" Exhibition) 
 Joshibi University of Art and Design
 Musashino Art University
 Nihon University College of Art
 Tama Art University
 Tokyo Zokei University

Art Universities Liaison Council 
 Joshibi University of Art and Design
 Musashino Art University
 Nihon University College of Art
 Tama Art University
 Tokyo University of the Arts
 Tokyo Zokei University

Comprehensive joint agreement 
 Waseda University
 Showa University
 Tokyo City University

Credit transfer agreement (Consortium of Universities in Hachioji)

Regional collaborative projects 
 Tama Rivers
 Sagamachi Consortium
 Hachioji Academic City University "Icho-juku"
 University/High School Collaboration Lectures
 Community gallery "Tamabiba"
 Art Laboratory Hashimoto

Art events/exhibitions 
 Tokyo International Mini-Print Triennial
 TAMAVIVANT
 CPUE : Curatorial Practice in the Urban Environment
 Tokyo Art Flow

Alumni association 
 The Alumni Association of Tama Art University

Publications 
 TAMABI NEWS
 tonATELIER
 tamabi.tv
 OpenCourseWare
 R

See also
 INVADER
 Mono-ha
 2020 Summer Olympics

References

Further reading 
 Minato, Chihiro and Yasuhito Nagahara et al. Sozo-sei no uchu [創造性の宇宙], Tokyo: Kosakusha, 2008. 
 Suzuki, Akira and Chihiro Minato (eds.) Tsukuru toshokan wo tsukuru [つくる図書館をつくる], Tokyo: Kashima Shuppankai, 2007.

External links
 Tama Art University Official Website
 
 
 Works by notable alumni
 tamabi.tv - OpenCourseWare
 Tama Art University Faculty Database

 
Educational institutions established in 1935
Private universities and colleges in Japan
Universities and colleges in Tokyo
1935 establishments in Japan
Arts organizations established in 1935
Hachiōji, Tokyo
Setagaya